Mohamed Diakité (born 10 July 1958) is a Guinean sprinter. He competed in the men's 400 metres at the 1980 Summer Olympics.

References

1958 births
Living people
Athletes (track and field) at the 1980 Summer Olympics
Guinean male sprinters
Olympic athletes of Guinea
Place of birth missing (living people)